Mannequin in Red is a 1958 Swedish crime/thriller film directed by Arne Mattson and written by Folke Mellvig.

Starring film couple Karl-Arne Holmsten and Annalisa Ericson as the investigating detective couple John and Kajsa Hillman; this time investigating a murder of a model connected to a famous Stockholm fashion house, La Femme.

The film is the second film in director Arne Mattsson's Hillman-series of five thriller films, all containing a colour in the title: Damen i svart (1958), The Mannequin in Red (1958), Ryttare i blått (~ Rider in Blue) (1959), Lady in White (1962), and The Yellow Car (1963).

External links

1958 films
Films directed by Arne Mattsson
Swedish crime thriller films
1950s Swedish-language films
Films about fashion
Mannequins in films
1950s Swedish films